Novica Bjelica (born 9 February 1983) is a Serbian volleyball player, a member of Serbia men's national volleyball team and French club Stade Poitevin Poitiers, a participant of the 2008 Olympic Games, medalist of European Championship, World Cup and World League, 2009 Italian Champion, 2015 Montenegrin Champion.

Career
He won several medals with the national team in international competitions. Novica represented his country at the 2008 Olympic Games. Serbian team was eliminated in the quarter finals of the Olympic tournament.

He won 2009 Italian Champion title with Copra Nordmeccanica Piacenza. Then he was a player of another Italian teams from Treviso and Rome. Bjelica played season 2012/13 in Turkish Fenerbahçe Istanbul. Season 2013/14 he spent in Brazilian league as Minas Tênis Clube player. Next season he played for Budvanska Rivijera Budva and he achieved title of 2015 Montenegrin Champion. In 2016 after short time in El Jaish, he signed contract with French club Stade Poitevin Poitiers.

Sporting achievements

Clubs

CEV Champions League
  2007/2008 – with Copra Nordmeccanica Piacenza

CEV Cup
  2010/2011 – with Sisley Treviso

South American Club Championship
  Brazil 2014 – with Minas Tênis Clube

National championships
 2007/2008  Italian Championship, with Copra Nordmeccanica Piacenza
 2008/2009  Italian Championship, with Copra Nordmeccanica Piacenza
 2009/2010  Italian SuperCup 2009, with Copra Nordmeccanica Piacenza
 2012/2013  Turkish SuperCup 2012, with Fenerbahçe Istanbul
 2014/2015  Montenegrin Championship, with Budvanska Rivijera Budva

References

1983 births
Living people
Sportspeople from Pula
Serbian men's volleyball players
Olympic volleyball players of Serbia
Volleyball players at the 2008 Summer Olympics
Yugoslav men's volleyball players
Fenerbahçe volleyballers
Serbs of Croatia
Mediterranean Games bronze medalists for Serbia
Competitors at the 2005 Mediterranean Games
PAOK V.C. players
Serbian expatriate sportspeople in Montenegro
Serbian expatriate sportspeople in Italy
Serbian expatriate sportspeople in Turkey
Serbian expatriate sportspeople in Brazil
Serbian expatriate sportspeople in Qatar
Serbian expatriate sportspeople in France
Mediterranean Games medalists in volleyball